The Kapenda Caldera (also known as the Kapenda Volcanic Centre) in New Zealands Taupō Volcanic Zone lies in a low land area immediately south of Lake Rotorua through the Hemo Gap in the Rotorua Caldera rim.

Geography
The Kapenga Caldera has a western boundary defined by the  Horohoro cliffs and an eastern boundary by volcanic domes, including those in the Ōkareka Embayment with some buried by the younger activity of the Ōkataina Volcanic Centre. Its southern boundary of volcanic activity is ill defined but does not extend to areas of continuing low residual gravity abnormality in the Paeroa Garben.

Geology
The Kapenda Caldera, just south of the Rotorua Caldera and between this and the Maroa Caldera, is believed to have been buried by subsequent eruptions including those of the Tarawera volcanic complex. Problematically to date no definite assignment of the up to seven ignimbrites attributed to it can be related to a definite caldera-forming event or documented collapse. It had several very large eruptive events during the ignimbrite flare-up of the Taupō Volcanic Zone between 350,000 to 240,000 years ago. The boundary between the Kapenda Caldera and the Ōkataina Caldera is debated which particularly affects more recent Earthquake Flat activity.  The Kapenda Caldera occupies the northern part of the Paeroa Garben between the uplift caused by the now fairly inactive Horohoro Fault and the uplift associated with the still very active Paeroa Fault. It contains the Ngakuru Graben. A large number of intra-rift faults called the Taupo Fault Belt and associated with the modern Taupō Rift exist in the Paeroa Garben and Kapenga Caldera so it is quite a tectonically active area now.
The recently paired in time Rotoiti eruption and Earthquake Flat Breccia eruptions had the later assigned as it was within the old caldera's margins but with greater understanding is best assigned to the magma mush body that underlays the magma bodies of the Ōkataina Volcanic Centre and so presently to this active volcanic centre.

There are two rhyolite domes of note. Haparangi Rhyolite has been a term used since 1937 to any rhyolite flows/lavas of Pliocene-Pleistocene origin in the Taupo Volcanic Zone and does not imply any origin from the Kapenda Caldera.

Eruptions
Its known eruptions were:
 890,000 - 680,000 years ago
Tikorangi Ignimbrite (sometime known as Pukerimu Ignimbrite). Erupted at 0.89 ± 0.04 Ma
Rahopaka Ignimbrite (0.77 ± 0.03 Ma)
Waiotapu Ignimbrite (0.71 ± 0.06 Ma)
Matahana Ignimbrite (0.68 ± 0.04 Ma) 
 310,000 - 275,000 years ago
The caldera is not a source of some of the Mamaku ignimbrite as previously speculated - this all originates from Rotorua Caldera.
Neither is the caldera the source of the Ohakuri Ignimbrite as previously speculated. This comes from the Ohakuri Caldera
Pokai lgnimbrite (0.275 ± 0.01 Ma) (previously assigned 0.23 - 0.22 Ma)
Eruptive volume 
Welded hard deposit almost reached Tokoroa in west and about Tauriko in north east.
The vent still has some uncertainity
Waihou (Chimp, Chimpanzee) Ignimbrite (0.31 ± 0.1 on stratographic grounds) (previously assigned 0.26 - 0.25 Ma) 
Eruptive volume 
Loose unwelded deposit reached Tauranga in north east and almost to Tokoroa in west
The vent still has some uncertainity
 (felt misassigned) 47,400 ± 1500 years ago (Earthquake Flat Breccia)
The historical ages in the literature were close to those now accepted. Some composition does not match well Waihou (Chimp) Ignimbrite or earlier. Current ages are based on 20 years revision work.

References 

Taupō Volcanic Zone
Calderas of New Zealand
Rift volcanoes
Pleistocene calderas